Gianni Vito Russo is an American actor and singer. He is best known for his role as Carlo Rizzi in the 1972 film The Godfather.

Life and career
Russo was born in Manhattan in 1943 and raised in Little Italy and Rosebank, Staten Island. After reprising Carlo Rizzi in a brief flashback scene at the end of The Godfather Part II, Russo acted in more than 46 films, including Goodnight, My Love (1972), Lepke (1975, as Albert Anastasia), Laserblast (1978), Chances Are (1989), The Freshman (1990), Side Out (1990), Another You (1991), Super Mario Bros. (1993), Any Given Sunday (1999) and Seabiscuit (2003).

Russo claims that he started a fledgling career in organized crime working as an errand boy and mob associate for Frank Costello as an adolescent but later abandoned the dangerous and volatile lifestyle of organized crime. The Staten Island Mafioso Tommy Bilotti was best man at Russo's wedding.

Since the beginning of his acting career, Russo owned a Las Vegas restaurant called Gianni Russo's State Street at 2570 State Street on the Las Vegas Strip (closed in 1988), and defeated 23 federal criminal indictments on a variety of charges stemming from alleged organized crime associations.

In 1988, Russo killed a man inside the Las Vegas nightclub. When he tried to intervene to stop a man from harassing a female patron, the man stabbed him with a broken champagne bottle. Russo, a legal carry owner, pulled his gun and shot him in the head. The man was a 30-year-old Cuban national. Russo was not charged with the killing because it was ruled a justifiable homicide by the Nevada District Attorney's Office.

Russo is also a singer. In 2004, he released a CD called Reflections that pays homage to Dean Martin and Frank Sinatra.

Russo owns a wine brand, Gianni Russo Wines, which debuted in 2009.

In 2019, he published his memoir, Hollywood Godfather: My Life in the Movies and the Mob.

Filmography

References

External links
 
 

Living people
American male film actors
American memoirists
American people of Italian descent
People from Manhattan
People from Staten Island
Year of birth missing (living people)